Philip John Micech (born August 11, 1961) was a defensive end for the Minnesota Vikings in the National Football League in 1987. He played at the collegiate level at the University of Wisconsin–Platteville where he now serves as the defensive line coach.

Biography
Micech was born in Milwaukee, Wisconsin.

Micech was inducted into the American Football Association's Semi Pro Football Hall of Fame 2001

Notes

Minnesota Vikings players
Players of American football from Milwaukee
Wisconsin–Platteville Pioneers football players
National Football League replacement players
1961 births
Living people